Aquatics is one of the sports at the biennial Southeast Asian Games (SEA) competition. It has been one of the sports held at the Games since the inaugural edition of the South East Asian Peninsular Games (SEAP) in 1959.

Editions

South East Asian Peninsular Games

Southeast Asian Games

See also
List of Southeast Asian Games records in swimming